Carnival '99 is the fourth release and second live album of Colorado-based jam band, The String Cheese Incident. This double album was taken from various live performances throughout 1999.

Track listing
"Shenandoah Breakdown"  (Traditional) - 3:28 
"Missin' Me"  (Kyle Hollingsworth, Paul Kleutz) - 14:32 
"Mouna Bowa"  (Guy N'Sangue, Jean Luc Ponty) - 7:04 
"Barstool"  (Bill Nershi) - 4:43 
"Take Five"  (Paul Desmond) - 7:17 
"Hey Pocky Way"  (Ziggy Modeliste, Art Neville, Leo Nocentelli, G.Porter Jr.) - 8:22  
"Black Clouds"  (Bill Nershi) - 13:16 
"Lester's Rant" - 0:47 
"Footprints" (Wayne Shorter) - 6:46 
"Don't Say"  (Kyle Hollingsworth) - 14:18 
"Birdland"  (Joe Zawinul) - 12:51 
"Hold Whatcha Got"  (Jimmy Martin) - 4:22 
"Jellyfish"  (The String Cheese Incident) - 14:11 
"Drum Jam"  (String Cheese Incident) - 4:13 
"Texas"  (Bill Nershi) - 13:30

Credits

The String Cheese Incident
Bill Nershi – Acoustic Guitar
Keith Moseley – Bass guitar
Kyle Hollingsworth – Accordion, Organ, Piano
Michael Kang – Mandolin, Violin
Michael Travis – Percussion, Conga, Timbales, Drums

The String Cheese Incident albums
2000 live albums